K. N. Pandita, also known as Kashi Nath Pandita (born 1929), is an Indian Kashmiri scholar in Persian and Central Asian Studies.
Born in  Jammu & Kashmir, Pandita studied and worked at Panjab University and University of Tehran, taught at the University of Kashmir and was the former professor and director at the Center of Central Asian Studies at the University of Kashmir. He was awarded UGC Emeritus Fellowship in Central Asian Studies 1978–88, and was awarded by the President and Vice President of India in 1985 and 1987 (respectively) for his academic attainments. He was a recipient of the Padma Shri in literature and education in 2017.

Works
 Pandit, K. N. (2013). Baharistan-i-shahi: A chronicle of mediaeval Kashmir. Srinagar: Gulshan Books. (Translation)
  Pandita, K. N. (2009). A Muslim missionary in mediaeval Kashmir: Being the English translation of Tohfatu'l-ahbab. New Delhi: Voice of India. (Translation)

References

External links
world-citizenship.org
Mediaeval Kashmir Historiography

20th-century Indian scholars
Kashmiri people
Kashmiri writers
1929 births
Living people
20th-century Indian male writers
21st-century Indian educators
Recipients of the Padma Shri in literature & education